Donald Vernon Burrows  (8 August 1928 – 12 March 2020) was an Australian jazz and swing musician who played clarinet, saxophone and flute.

Life and career
Donald Vernon Burrows was born on 8 August 1928, the only child of Vernon and Beryl and attended Bondi Public School. In 1937 a visiting flutist and teacher (Victor McMahon) inspired him to start learning the flute. He began on a B-flat flute which he later played at Carnegie Hall and the Newport Jazz Festival. By 1940 he was captain of the Metropolitan Schools Flute Band and studying at the Sydney Conservatorium of Music.

By 1942, aged 14, Burrows had begun playing clarinet and quit school. He began appearing at Sydney jazz clubs, and appeared on The Youth Show, a Macquarie Radio show. In 1944 he was invited to play and record with George Trevare's Australians. He became well-known in Sydney jazz circles and was performing in dance halls, nightclubs and radio bands.

During the 1960s and 1970s, Burrows had many engagements in Australia and the United States, including six years performing at the Wentworth Hotel in Sydney. In 1972, he was invited to perform at the Montreux Jazz Festival and later the Newport Jazz Festival.

The year 1973 was a watershed one for Burrows as he received the first gold record for an Australian jazz musician for his record Just the Beginning, instigated the first jazz studies program in the southern hemisphere, at the New South Wales Conservatorium of Music (under the direction of Rex Hobcroft) and was appointed a Member of the Order of the British Empire (MBE). In 1979 he was appointed Chair of Jazz Studies at the conservatorium.

Burrows performed to mostly classical music audiences through tours with Musica Viva and the Australian Broadcasting Corporation concert series. He led the nationally televised show The Don Burrows Collection for six years. He had an extensive recording career with his groups and performed on albums by others.

In the 1980s, Burrows mentored and was closely associated with James Morrison. He formed the Don Burrows Quartet with George Golla (guitar), Ed Gaston (double bass) and Alan Turnbull (drums). He also worked with Frank Sinatra, Dizzy Gillespie, Nat King Cole, Oscar Peterson, Tony Bennett, Stéphane Grappelli, Cleo Laine, and the Sydney Symphony Orchestra.

In 2005, Burrows toured with a small band that included the Australian jazz pianist Kevin Hunt. He used his photographic images with his music in a show called Stop, Look and Listen.

Burrows had arthritis from age 38. In a 2008 interview with the Australian Broadcasting Corporation's Andrew Ford, celebrating his 80th birthday, he said that "arthritis is not the greatest for playing a musical instrument. But playing a musical instrument is very, very good for arthritis". In later years he had Alzheimer's disease and lived in a nursing home in northern Sydney. He died on 12 March 2020, aged 91.

Awards and honours
 1973: Member of the Order of the British Empire (MBE)
 1987: Officer of the Order of Australia (AO)
 1988: Life member of the New South Wales Conservatorium of Music
 1989: Named one of the Australian Living Treasures
 2000: Honorary Doctorate in Music, Sydney University
 2001: Honorary Doctorate in Music, Edith Cowan University, Perth

APRA Awards
The APRA Awards are held in Australia and New Zealand by the Australasian Performing Right Association to recognise songwriting skills, sales and airplay performance by its members annually.

|-
| 2004
| Don Burrows
| Ted Albert Award for Outstanding Services to Australian Music
| 
|}

ARIA Awards
The ARIA Music Awards is an annual awards ceremony that recognises excellence, innovation, and achievement across all genres of Australian music. It commenced in 1987.

! 
|-
| 1988
| Nice 'n' Easy (with Adelaide Connection)
| Best Jazz Album
| 
| 
|-
| 1991
| Don Burrows
| ARIA Hall of Fame
| 
|
|-
| 2006
| Non Stop Flight - Great Music of the Swing Era (with The Mell-O-Tones & Phillip Sametz)
| Best Jazz Album
| 
| 
|-
| 2016
| In Good Company (with James Morrison)
| Best Jazz Album
| 
| 
|-
|}

Australian Jazz Bell Awards
The Australian Jazz Bell Awards recognised the talent and achievements of Australian jazz artists locally and internationally

|-
| 2008
| Don Burrows
| Australian Jazz Bell Hall of Fame
| 
|}

Bernard Heinze Memorial Award
The Sir Bernard Heinze Memorial Award is given to a person who has made an outstanding contribution to music in Australia.

! 
|-
| 1999 || Don Burrows || Sir Bernard Heinze Memorial Award ||  || 
|-

Mo Awards
The Australian Entertainment Mo Awards (commonly known informally as the Mo Awards), were annual Australian entertainment industry awards. They recognise achievements in live entertainment in Australia from 1975 to 2016. Don Burrows won one award in that time.
 (wins only)
|-
| 1992
| Don Burrows 
| John Campbell Fellowship Award 
| 
|-

Discography

Albums

Compilations

References

External links
 Just the Beginning samples
 
 

1928 births
2020 deaths
Musicians from Sydney
21st-century clarinetists
21st-century saxophonists
APRA Award winners
ARIA Award winners
ARIA Hall of Fame inductees
Australian jazz clarinetists
Australian jazz flautists
Australian jazz saxophonists
Australian Members of the Order of the British Empire
Male jazz musicians
Male saxophonists
Officers of the Order of Australia
People with Alzheimer's disease
21st-century Australian male musicians
21st-century Australian musicians
20th-century saxophonists
20th-century flautists
21st-century flautists